Latin American Yo-Yo Contest (LYYC) is the South American competition of yo-yo organized and sanctioned by the International Yo-Yo Federation (IYYF), and is one of 4 annual multi-national yo-yo competitions from which winners receive seeds to compete in the semi-finals of the annual World Yo-Yo Contest.

This event is called Campeonato Latinoamericano de Yo-yo in Spanish.

Contests
LYYC had 5 title divisions, 1 non-title division, and 2 national divisions in 2015.

History
There was a plan to promote the international contest for yo-yo in America continent before LYYC. Isaac Kanarek, the president of Mexican Yo-Yo Association (AMYY) tried to promote North American Yo-Yo Championship in 2010 but it had been cancelled.

In addition, Gregory Cohen the founder of World Yo-Yo Contest (WYYC) tried to promote Pan American International Yo-Yo Contest as the American Continental contest on June 30, July 1 & 2 2014 but it was also cancelled.

After International Yo-Yo Federation (IYYF) in 2013, Kanarek offered the international contest for South American nations to give Latin players chance to participate in world contest during annual meeting in 2014 WYYC Prague. His proposal was accepted. This was the start of Latin American Yo-Yo Contest.

Participating nations
The 60 competitors came from 5 nations from the American continents.

South America

North America

List of champions

Latin American Category

1A

2A

3A

4A

5A

Spintop (Trompo)

Mexican national category

Intermediate 1A (Intermedios)

Beginners 1A (Peincipiantes)

See also
World Yo-Yo Contest
European Yo-Yo Championship
Asia Pacific Yo-Yo Championships

References

External links
LYYC 2015

Yo-yo competitions